Azat Khodzhageldyevich Bayryev (born 17 February 1989) is a Russian football player who plays for FC Kuban Krasnodar.

Club career
He made his debut in the Russian Premier League for FC Kuban Krasnodar on 14 March 2009 in a game against FC Rubin Kazan.

While with FC Rotor Volgograd, Bayryev was voted the second-best FNL player for the month of November 2019, after amassing the greatest number of duels won and scoring the game-winning goal in the last match of the month.

Personal life 
Azat was born in Turkmen SSR. His father is Turkmen origin, mother is Russian. At the age of five he moved to Russian Federation.

External links
 
  Profile on the FC Kuban Krasnodar site

References

1989 births
People from Balkanabat
Russian people of Turkmenistan descent
Living people
Russian footballers
Russia youth international footballers
Russia under-21 international footballers
Association football midfielders
FC Kuban Krasnodar players
FC Salyut Belgorod players
FC Dynamo Bryansk players
FC Spartak Vladikavkaz players
FC SKA-Khabarovsk players
FC Volgar Astrakhan players
FC Rotor Volgograd players
FC Urozhay Krasnodar players
Russian Premier League players
Russian First League players
Russian Second League players